Bob Biver (born February 17, 1985) is a Luxembourgish alpine skier.

Bob first skied at the age of 3 and joined the Luxembourg national ski team at the age of 10 years. He won the slalom on the national championships in Adelboden, and participated at the Alpine World Ski Championships in Åre in slalom and giant slalom.

References

1985 births
Living people
Luxembourgian male alpine skiers
21st-century Luxembourgian people
Place of birth missing (living people)